Third Eye Open is a 1992 album by American funk/rock supergroup Hardware. Hardware consists of lead guitarist Stevie Salas, P-Funk bassist Bootsy Collins, and drummer Buddy Miles, formerly of the Band of Gypsys. The album was produced by Bill Laswell and Salas, and was the first release to be part of Laswell's Black Arc Series, which includes Lord of the Harvest by Zillatron, Out of the Dark by O.G. Funk, and Under the 6 by Slave Master.

Album history
When the album was first released in Japan on the Polystar label, the band was called The Third Eye and the name of the album was "Hardware". When the album secured distribution in the U.S., it was found that another band had owned the name "The Third Eye". To avoid any further legal hassles, it was opted that the title of the album and the name of band would simply be switched, thus the name of the band would be Hardware and the title of the album became Third Eye Open.

The song "Leakin'" is a version of a track that appeared on Collins' 1988 album What's Bootsy Doin'?, which featured Salas playing guitar. On this album, the song is credited to Salas, whereas the previous version is credited to Collins, George Clinton and Trey Stone.

Track listing

Personnel
Stevie Salas – guitars, vocals
Bootsy Collins – space bass, vocals
Buddy Miles – drums, fuzz bass, vocals
George Clinton, Gary "Mudbone" Cooper, Bernard Fowler – background vocals
David Friendly, Vince McClean, Matt Stein – digital bollocks

Hardware (band) albums
1992 albums
Albums produced by Bill Laswell
Rykodisc albums